Pitt Township is one of the thirteen townships of Wyandot County, Ohio, United States.  The 2010 census found 1,012 people in the township, 204 of whom lived in the village of Harpster.

Geography
Located in the southern part of the county, it borders the following townships:
Crane Township - north
Antrim Township - east
Grand Township, Marion County - southeast corner
Salt Rock Township, Marion County - south
Marseilles Township - southwest
Mifflin Township - northwest

The village of Harpster is located in central Pitt Township.

Name and history
Formed in 1845, the same year as Wyandot County, Pitt was established from portions of Salt Rock Township in Marion County.  It is in the southernmost part of Wyandot County, bordering northern Marion County on its south, Marseilles and Mifflin townships on the west, on the north by Crane Township, and on the east by Antrim Township. In 1823 Hannahrett Wilson, daughter of Joseph Wilson and Chlorine Woolsey, was the first European child born in the township.

Government
The township is governed by a three-member board of trustees, who are elected in November of odd-numbered years to a four-year term beginning on the following January 1. Two are elected in the year after the presidential election and one is elected in the year before it. There is also an elected township fiscal officer, who serves a four-year term beginning on April 1 of the year after the election, which is held in November of the year before the presidential election. Vacancies in the fiscal officership or on the board of trustees are filled by the remaining trustees.

References

External links
County website

Townships in Wyandot County, Ohio
Townships in Ohio
1845 establishments in Ohio